Abdur Razzaq (born 1949) is a Bangladeshi barrister and former Assistant Secretary General of political party Bangladesh Jamaat-e-Islami. He was the chief defence counsel at Bangladesh's International Crimes Tribunal until the end of 2013, when he left Dhaka for London. There he practices at the English Bar.

International Crimes Tribunal
Razzaq was the chief defence counsel at Bangladesh's International Crimes Tribunal, where Jamaat leaders, in particular, were indicted. Among those defended by Razzaq were former leader Ghulam Azam, leader Motiur Rahman Nizami, executive council member Delwar Hossain Sayedee, Secretary General Ali Ahsan Mohammad Mojaheed, and Assistant Secretary General Abdul Quader Mollah. Razzaq allegedly was harassed in various ways by government officials to make it difficult for him to perform his professional duties. Human Rights Watch called for him to be allowed to conduct a full and fair defence without hindrance.

Resigned 
Razzaq resigned from Bangladesh Jamaat-e-Islami's Assistant Secretary General in an e-mail message from London on February 15, 2019. In his resignation message, suggesting that he apologize for his role in the war of liberation, he said that for two decades he had tried to convince Jamaat that there should be open discussion on the role of the party in the state and that the nation should apologize for the role of Jamat at that time. Apart from Jamat, his resignation also sparked widespread discussion in Bangladesh politics. Following him, some of the top leaders resigned from the party.

References

Living people
1949 births
Bangladeshi barristers
20th-century Bangladeshi lawyers
21st-century Bangladeshi lawyers